The members of the National Assembly of Zambia from 2016 until 2021 were elected on 11 August 2016. They consisted of 156 elected members, eight members appointed by the President, the Speaker and the Vice-President. The elected members included 80 from the Patriotic Front, 58 from the United Party for National Development, three from the Movement for Multi-Party Democracy, one from the Forum for Democracy and Development and 14 independents.

List of members

Elected members

Non-elected members

References

2016